Dr.Rony David is an Indian actor who appears in Malayalam cinema, mainly in supporting roles. He made his debut in the 2007 film Chocolate. He is also a physician who practiced at KIMS Hospital before foraying into acting. He got a breakthrough with the 2016 film Aanandam.

Filmography

Films

Short films

References

External links
 

Indian male film actors
Male actors in Malayalam cinema
21st-century Indian male actors
Living people
Year of birth missing (living people)